Laish Zane Boyd, is the current Bishop of Nassau and The Bahamas, a diocese of the Anglican Communion.

References

Year of birth missing (living people)
Living people
21st-century Anglican bishops in the Caribbean
Anglican bishops of Nassau
Place of birth missing (living people)